Siyəzən or Siyazan or Siazan may refer to:
Siyəzən, Azerbaijan
Siyəzən, Beşdam, Azerbaijan
Siyəzən Rayon, Azerbaijan

See also
Siazan